Ocinara is a genus of moths of the family Bombycidae. The genus was erected by Francis Walker in 1856.

Selected species
Ocinara abbreviata Dierl, 1978
Ocinara albiceps (Walker, 1862)
Ocinara albicollis (Walker, 1862)
Ocinara bifurcula Dierl, 1978
Ocinara dilectula Walker, 1856
Ocinara ficicola (Ormerod, 1889)
Ocinara malagasy Viette, 1965
Ocinara polia (Tams 1935)

References

Bombycidae